Banca Mediolanum S.p.A. is an Italian bank, insurance and asset management conglomerate which is the parent company of Gruppo Mediolanum (Mediolanum Group). The CEO of the company is Massimo Antonio Doris, and the bank is listed on the Borsa Italiana and is a constituent of the FTSE MIB index from the end of 2015 when it incorporated it parent company Mediolanum S.p.A. Mediolanum Group was founded by Ennio Doris, the current second largest shareholders of the conglomerate. The conglomerate provided asset management, banking, insurances services to customers in Italy, Spain (as Banco Mediolanum and Fibanc) and Germany (Bankhaus August Lenz & Co.)

Despite being ranked sixth by market capitalization among financial services companies (behind Intesa Sanpaolo, UniCredit, Assicurazioni Generali, UnipolSai and Mediobanca in 2016), the conglomerate (Mediolanum S.p.A.) was ranked 13th by total assets among bank (2014 data), as well as much smaller in size by risk-weighed assets, thus the conglomerate (Mediolanum S.p.A nor Banca Mediolanum) was not included in the Single Supervisory Mechanism. However, after Banca Mediolanum reversed the merger with Mediolanum, the European Central Bank started a comprehensive assessment to assess the conglomerate and decided the conglomerate would not be included. Eventually, Banca Mediolanum remained as a less-significant bank, which would not be supervised by the European Central Bank directly.

References

External links
 Official website (in Italian)

Banks of Italy
Insurance companies of Italy
Financial services companies established in 1991
Banks established in 1991
Italian companies established in 1991